1086 Nata, provisional designation , is a carbonaceous Veritasian asteroid from the outer regions of the asteroid belt, approximately 68 kilometers in diameter. It was discovered on 25 August 1927, by Russian astronomers Sergey Belyavsky and Nikolaj Ivanov at the Simeiz Observatory on the Crimean peninsula. The asteroid was named in memory of Soviet female parachutist Nata Babushkina (1915–1936).

Orbit and classification 

Nata is a member of the Veritas family, a young family of carbonaceous asteroids, that formed approximately  million years ago. The family is named after 490 Veritas and consists of nearly 1,300 members.

Nata orbits the Sun in the outer main-belt at a distance of 3.0–3.3 AU once every 5 years and 7 months (2,054 days). Its orbit has an eccentricity of 0.05 and an inclination of 8° with respect to the ecliptic.

Physical characteristics 

In the SMASS classification, Nata is a Ch-subtype, a "hydrated" carbonaceous C-type asteroid.

Rotation period 

In November 2011, a rotational lightcurve of Nata was obtained from photometric observations by American astronomer Edwin E. Sheridan at the Crescent Butte Observatory . Lightcurve analysis gave a rotation period of 18.074 hours with a brightness amplitude of 0.17 magnitude.

Diameter and albedo 

According to the surveys carried out by the Spitzer Space Telescope, the Infrared Astronomical Satellite IRAS, the Japanese Akari satellite and the NEOWISE mission of NASA's Wide-field Infrared Survey Explorer, Nata measures between 66.27 and 79.867 kilometers in diameter  and its surface has an albedo between 0.04 and 0.0767.

The Collaborative Asteroid Lightcurve Link derives an albedo of 0.0641 and a diameter of 66.10 kilometers based on an absolute magnitude of 9.5.

Naming 

This minor planet was named in memory of Nadezhda Vasilievna Babushkina (1915–1936), nicknamed "Nata", a Soviet female parachutist who died in an accident at the age of 21.

References

External links 
 Asteroid Lightcurve Database (LCDB), query form (info )
 Dictionary of Minor Planet Names, Google books
 Asteroids and comets rotation curves, CdR – Observatoire de Genève, Raoul Behrend
 Discovery Circumstances: Numbered Minor Planets (1)-(5000) – Minor Planet Center
 
 

001086
Discoveries by Sergei Belyavsky
Discoveries by Nikolaj Ivanov
Named minor planets
001086
19270825